Robert Luke Devaney (born 1948) is an American mathematician, the Feld Family Professor of Teaching Excellence at Boston University. His research involves dynamical systems and fractals.

Education and career
Devaney was born on April 9, 1948, and grew up in Methuen, Massachusetts.

Devaney graduated in 1969 from the College of the Holy Cross,
and earned his Ph.D. in 1973 from the University of California, Berkeley under the supervision of Stephen Smale. Before joining the faculty at Boston University, he taught at Tufts University, Northwestern University, and the University of Maryland, College Park.

Mathematical activities
Devaney is known for formulating a simple and widely used definition of chaotic systems, one that does not need advanced concepts such as measure theory. In his 1989 book An Introduction to Chaotic Dynamical Systems, Devaney defined a system to be chaotic if it has sensitive dependence on initial conditions, it is topologically transitive (for any two open sets, some points from one set will eventually hit the other set), and its periodic orbits form a dense set. Later, it was observed that this definition is redundant: sensitive dependence on initial conditions follows automatically as a mathematical consequence of the other two properties.

Devaney hairs, a fractal structure in certain Julia sets, are named after Devaney, who was the first to investigate them.

As well as research and teaching in mathematics, Devaney's mathematical activities have included organizing one-day immersion programs in mathematics for thousands of Boston-area high school students, and consulting on the mathematics behind media productions including the 2008 film 21 and the 1993 play Arcadia. He was president of the Mathematical Association of America from 2013 to 2015.

Awards and honors
In 1995, Devaney won the Deborah and Franklin Tepper Haimo Award for Distinguished University Teaching of the Mathematical Association of America.
In 2002 Devaney won the National Science Foundation Director's Award for Distinguished Teaching Scholars.
He was named the inaugural Feld Professor in 2010.

In 2008, a conference in honor of Devaney's 60th birthday was held in Tossa de Mar, Spain. The papers from the conference were published in a special issue of the Journal of Difference Equations and Applications in 2010, also honoring Devaney.
 
In 2012 he became one of the inaugural fellows of the American Mathematical Society.

Selected publications
Books
Devaney is the author of books on fractals and dynamical systems including:
An Introduction to Chaotic Dynamical Systems (Benjamin/Cummings 1986; 2nd ed., Addison-Wesley, 1989; reprinted by Westview Press, 2003)
The Science of Fractal Images (with Barnsley, Mandelbrot, Peitgen, Saupe, and Voss, Springer-Verlag, 1988)
Chaos, Fractals, and Dynamics: Computer Experiments in Mathematics (Addison-Wesley, 1990)
A First Course in Chaotic Dynamical Systems: Theory and Experiment (Addison-Wesley, 1992)
Fractals: A Tool Kit of Dynamics Activities (with J. Choate and A. Foster, Key Curriculum Press, 1999)
Iteration: A Tool Kit of Dynamics Activities (with J. Choate and A. Foster, Key Curriculum Press, 1999)
Chaos: A Tool Kit of Dynamics Activities (with J. Choate, Key Curriculum Press, 2000)
The Mandelbrot and Julia Sets: A Tool Kit of Dynamics Activities (Key Curriculum Press, 2000)
Differential Equations (with P. Blanchard and G. R. Hall, 3rd ed., Brooks/Cole, 2005)
Differential Equations, Dynamical Systems, and an Introduction to Chaos (with Morris Hirsch and Stephen Smale, 2nd ed., Academic Press, 2004; 3rd ed., Academic Press, 2013)

Research papers
Some of the more highly cited of Devaney's research publications include:
.
.
.
.

References

1948 births
Living people
20th-century American mathematicians
21st-century American mathematicians
College of the Holy Cross alumni
University of California, Berkeley alumni
Tufts University faculty
Northwestern University faculty
University of Maryland, College Park faculty
Boston University faculty
Dynamical systems theorists
Fellows of the American Mathematical Society
American textbook writers